Amblyeleotris wheeleri, the Gorgeous prawn-goby, is a species of goby native to tropical reefs of the Indian Ocean to the western Pacific Ocean. It is a commensal with alpheid shrimps, most often being found in association with Alpheus ochrostriatus. This species can reach a length of  SL. It can also be found in the aquarium trade.

Etymology
The specific name honours the English ichthyologist Alwynne Cooper Wheeler (1929-2005), who was curator of Fishes at the British Museum (Natural History), "for his help over the years, particularly with the authors’ study of prawn-associated gobies of the Seychelles".

References

External links
 

Amblyeleotris
Taxa named by Nicholas Vladimir Campbel Polunin
Taxa named by Roger Lubbock
Fish described in 1977